Chongqing Xiannüshan Airport or Chongqing Xiannyushan Airport  is an airport that serves Wulong District, Chongqing municipality, China. Construction began in 2014 and lasted five years, with an estimated total cost of 1.333 billion yuan (about $145 million).

The airport opened on December 18, 2020.

Facilities
Chongqing Xiannüshan Airport has a 2,800-meter-long runway (class 4C), occupying an area of 3,476 mu.

Airlines and destinations

See also
List of airports in China
List of the busiest airports in China

References

Airports in Chongqing
Airports established in 2020
2020 establishments in China